Catherine the Great is a British-American miniseries in four parts written by Nigel Williams and directed by Philip Martin for Sky Atlantic and HBO Miniseries. It stars Helen Mirren as the titular Catherine the Great.

The miniseries premiered in its entirety on 3 October 2019 on Sky Atlantic in the United Kingdom. It debuted on 21 October 2019 on HBO in the United States. The show was also distributed worldwide by Sky Vision.

Plot

The miniseries depicts Empress Catherine II of Russia's reign, from 1764, two years after taking power, until her death in 1796.

Cast and characters

Starring
Helen Mirren as Catherine the Great, the Empress of Russia
Jason Clarke as Grigory Potemkin, a military commander and Catherine's lover
Rory Kinnear as Nikita Ivanovich Panin, Catherine's foreign minister
Gina McKee as Countess Praskovya Bruce, a lifelong friend and confidante of Catherine's
Kevin R. McNally as Alexei Orlov, a Russian statesman and later Catherine's Minister of War
Richard Roxburgh as Grigory Orlov, a former lover of Catherine's who orchestrated the coup d'état that allowed her to gain power
Joseph Quinn as Paul Petrovich, Tsarevich of Russia, Catherine's son
Clive Russell as the Fool
Paul Kaye as Yemelyan Pugachev, a Yaik Cossack who instigates a popular revolt against Catherine
Paul Ritter as Alexander Suvorov

Recurring
Thomas Doherty as Pyotr Zavadovsky, Catherine's (private) secretary and lover
Iain Mitchell as Archbishop Arsenius, metropolitan of Rostov and Yaroslavl
Georgina Beedle as Natalia Alexeievna, Paul's first wife
John Hodgkinson as Pyotr Rumyantsev
Phil Dunster as Andrey Razumovsky, Natalia's lover
James Northcote as Alexander Bezborodko, Catherine's secretary and assistant
Antonia Clarke as Maria Fedorovna, Paul's second wife
Adam El Hagar as Valerian Zubov, Catherine's aide-de-camp and Platon Zubov's brother

Guest
Lucas Englander as Vasily Mirovich, a Lieutenant of the Smolensk Regiment
Simon Thorp as Captain Danilo Vlasev, a guard at Shlisselburg Fortress
Ellis Howard as Ivan VI of Russia, the deposed Emperor of Russia incarcerated at Shlisselburg Fortress
Sam Palladio as Alexander Vasilchikov, one of Catherine's lovers
Andrew Rothney as Alexander Dmitriev-Mamonov, one of Catherine's lovers
Aina Norgilaite as Elena
Andrew Bone as Charles-Joseph de Ligne, a Field Marshal and a diplomat in service of the Archduchy of Austria
Raphael Acloque as Platon Zubov, one of Catherine's lovers
Felix Jamieson as Alexander, Catherine's grandson and future Emperor

Filming locations
The majority of filming took place in Lithuania, due to scenery of the country and favourable film tax incentives - Vilnius, Pažaislis monastery and Trakai Island Castle.
A large part of filming, in particular the episodes happening in the throne room, many corridor episodes, the cross-dressing ball at the end of Episode 1, and the scenes that take place on the stairs outside the palace, were filmed in Rundāle Palace in Latvia. Other scenes were filmed in St Petersburg, Peterhof Palace, and Catherine Palace in Tsarskoye Selo Russia.

Episodes

Release
The four-part miniseries premiered in its entirety on Sky Atlantic, On Demand and Now TV in the United Kingdom on 3 October 2019. It debuted in its entirety on HBO Go and HBO Now in the United States on 21 October 2019, while HBO broadcast one part per week until 11 November 2019. Catherine the Great premiered on Fox Showcase in Australia on 3 November 2019.

Reception
On review aggregator Rotten Tomatoes, the film holds an approval rating of 68% based on 40 reviews, with an average rating of 6.9/10. The website's critics consensus reads, "Though its sumptuous setting and design often outshines its storytelling, Catherine the Great remains a seductive, if scattershot, period drama thanks to the great Helen Mirren". On Metacritic, the series has a weighted average score of 61 out of 100, based on 18 critics, indicating "generally favorable reviews".

The Guardian, while praising Helen Mirren's (Helen Mirronoff, daughter of a Russian émigré) performance, found the work, overall, lacking.

Variety wrote: "Stepping back from the series' four episodes reveals a disappointing lack of ambition in portraying such a titanic force's final days".

Mike Hale of The New York Times criticized the film for having "a lot of yelling and passionate making up", and called it "a little distant and slightly embarrassing", comparing it to "a couple you don't know arguing in a parking lot".

Brian Lowry of CNN wrote "The peccadilloes of royalty never go out of fashion, but Catherine -- with her tumultuous decades-long reign -- brings more intrigue to the party than most".

Vanity Fairs Sonia Saraiya said that "Catherine the Great reframes her desire as part of her glory - and revels in that glory, without asking too many awkward questions".

According to David Fear of the Rolling Stone, "You can feel that [directors] are relying on the mighty Dame Helen to do most of the dramatic heavy lifting here. You can also sense when, despite her best efforts, that particular plan of action still falls short".

Accolades

References

Bibliography

External linksCatherine the Great'' on HBO

2019 British television series debuts
2019 American television series debuts
2019 British television series endings
2019 American television series endings
2010s British television miniseries
2010s American television miniseries
English-language television shows
2010s British drama television series
2010s American drama television series
American biographical series
Depictions of Catherine the Great on television
HBO original programming
Sky Atlantic original programming
Television series set in the 18th century